"Robbers" is a song by English rock band The 1975, released as the sixth single from their self-titled debut on 26 May 2014.

Background
The concept of the song, about an ill-fated robbery heist, was inspired by the 1993 film True Romance, particularly Patricia Arquette's character Alabama Worley.

Following its release, it debuted at number 179 on the UK Singles Chart.

The song, thematically, is an ode to toxic relationships. This song's lyrical content concerns two lovers who aren't good for each other. With the message that they know that their relationship will one day end, but they are still holding each other, robbing happiness from each other and pretending that they will be happy forever.

Healy has stated that the song and music video was inspired by one of the singer’s favorite movie characters. "I got really obsessed with the idea behind Patricia Arquette's character in True Romance when I was about 18," he said. "That craving for the bad boy in that film, it's so sexualized," he added. "It was something I was obsessed with."

"'Robbers' is about a heist that goes wrong," Healy added. "I suppose you can read it as a metaphor, and a girl who's obsessed with her professional killer boyfriend. It's a romantic ideal."

Music video
The official music video for "Robbers" was released on 27 April 2014, directed by Tim Mattia. A large portion of the video was filmed in Taft, California. The video stars Healy and actress Chelsea Schuchman as a couple who rob a shop to obtain money to "fund their alcohol and drug addiction." Despite Healy sustaining a shot in the stomach, the heist ends up a success.

Personnel 
Adapted from liner notes.

Charts

Certifications

Release history

References

Songs about crime
Songs about criminals
2013 songs
2014 singles
Songs written by Matthew Healy
The 1975 songs
Cultural depictions of Quentin Tarantino